The Heart's Tremolo is the second album by the American alternative rock band Tsunami, released in 1994. The band supported the album with a North American tour.

Critical reception

Trouser Press wrote that "the band explores artful pop terrain that is alternately lushly balladic and quirky in an almost avant-folk manner." The Washington Post determined that "since Tsunami is better at texture than riffs or tunes, most of the songs offer few counterpoints to the basic dirge." The Guardian concluded that "such wryly intelligent lyrics deserve a more dynamic setting."

Nashville Scene, in 1997, panned "the junior-high-loser love poetry that Toomey crooned."

Track listing

 "Loud Is as Loud Does"
 "Quietnova"
 "Be Like That"
 "Fast Food Medicine"
 "Kidding on the Square"
 "Slaw"
 "Cowed by the Bla Bla"
 "The Heart's Tremolo"
 "Le Bride d'Elegance"
 "Fits and Starts"

References

Tsunami (band) albums
1994 albums